Euroschinus aoupiniensis is a species of plant in the family Anacardiaceae. It is endemic to New Caledonia.

References

Endemic flora of New Caledonia
aoupiniensis
Vulnerable plants
Taxonomy articles created by Polbot